The women's team squash event of the 2019 Pan American Games was held from July 28th – July 31st at the CAR Voleibol en la Videna in Lima, Peru. The defending Pan American Games champion is the team from Canada.

The United States team took the gold by defeating Canada in the finals. Colombia and Mexico took home the bronze medals, which repeated the same results from four years prior in Toronto.

Results

Round Robin
The round robin will be used as a qualification round. The 8 teams will be split into groups of four. All teams will advance to the quarterfinals. The following is the group results.

Pool A

Pool B

Playoffs
The following is the playoff results.

5th-8th place
The following is 5th-8th place round results.

Final standings

References

Squash at the 2019 Pan American Games